Skipworth's Addition is an archeological site located near Harwood, Anne Arundel County, Maryland.  It was identified in 1990 when the owners of the property unearthed several large pieces of North Devon pottery.  Later excavation produced 17th-century artifacts, including glass, tobacco pipes, nails, refined earthenwares, and coarse ceramics, which confirm this site to be that of Skipworth's Addition.  The site is located within the bounds of the 1664 patent "The Addition," which was issued in December 1662 to George Skipworth (also - Skipwith, Skipwirth) for an  tract. The Skipwiths were active members of the Quaker community and hosted a half-year Meeting for Men in their home at Skipworth's Addition in 1680.

It was listed on the National Register of Historic Places in 2008.

References

External links
 at Maryland Historical Trust

Archaeological sites on the National Register of Historic Places in Maryland
Archaeological sites in Anne Arundel County, Maryland
Province of Maryland
Quakerism in Maryland
National Register of Historic Places in Anne Arundel County, Maryland
1664 establishments in Maryland